95 Chestnut Street is a historic house located in Wakefield, Massachusetts. It is significant as an example of a well-preserved vernacular Greek Revival style house.

Description and history 
The -story wood-frame house was built in 1849 for Joshua Whittemore, who in 1862 invented a crutch (having lost a leg in an accident in 1850) that was sold worldwide. The house's gable end faces the street, with return eaves and wide corner boards. The front porch is a later Stick Style addition, with pediments and sawtooth ornamentation.

The house was listed on the National Register of Historic Places in 1989.

See also
National Register of Historic Places listings in Wakefield, Massachusetts
National Register of Historic Places listings in Middlesex County, Massachusetts

References

Houses on the National Register of Historic Places in Wakefield, Massachusetts
Houses completed in 1849
Houses in Wakefield, Massachusetts
Greek Revival architecture in Massachusetts